Phryne (Polish: Fryne) is an 1867 oil on canvas painting by Artur Grottger, now in the Czartoryski Museum in Krakow, Poland.

Description
The painting portrays the ancient Greek courtesan Phryne, who revealed her breasts before her judges to save herself from a death sentence for sacrilege. It depicts a naked woman standing in the middle of the painting and a bush in the background. Her left hand is raised in order to cover her face. Her right hand holds a red robe lying at her feet. It was painted during the artist's stay in Paris a few months before his death.

See also
List of Polish painters

References

Bibliography
 
 
 
 
 
 
 
 
 
 

Collection of the Czartoryski Museum
1867 paintings
Polish paintings
Nude art
Women in art
Cultural depictions of Phryne